Colin Sinclair is a minister of the Church of Scotland. He was Moderator of the General Assembly for the year from May 2019. He has served as the minister at Palmerston Place Church in Edinburgh since 1996.

Early life and education
Sinclair grew up in Glasgow, Scotland. He was educated at Glasgow Academy, a private school in the city. He studied economics at the University of Stirling: he was an extra in a Monty Python film during this time. He graduated with an honours degree at the age of 20.

He became a Christian while at school, his parents had been rare church-goers, and became involved in the Scripture Union (SU). He continued to be involved with the SU while at university, and also attended the Christian Union. Feeling the call to ministry, he successfully underwent selection for the Church of Scotland. However, he was offered the opportunity to work with the SU in Zambia, where he spent the next three years. Having returned to Scotland, he trained for the ministry at New College, Edinburgh, graduating with a further degree in church history.

Ordained ministry

He was previously General Director of Scripture Union in their Glasgow office. Prior to working full-time with Scripture Union, he was a minister at Newton-on-Ayr Parish Church. In addition to his parish duties, he has also served as International Chair of Scripture Union since 2004, has led Scripture Union holiday camps for children in the Scottish Highlands, was Convener of the Church of Scotland's Mission & Discipleship Council (2012-2016) and has served as Chair of the Spring Harvest Council. Sinclair is within the evangelical wing of the Church of Scotland, having also spoken at the 'Church of Scotland Evangelical Network'.

On 9 October 2018, it was announced that he had been nominated as the next Moderator of the General Assembly of the Church of Scotland. He took up the position in May 2019.

Personal life
In 1981, he married Ruth Murray; they have a son and three daughters. His son, Timothy, is also a minister in the Church of Scotland, serving at Partick Trinity Parish Church.

See also
List of Moderators of the General Assembly of the Church of Scotland

References

21st-century Ministers of the Church of Scotland
Living people
Year of birth missing (living people)
People educated at the Glasgow Academy
Moderators of the General Assembly of the Church of Scotland
Alumni of the University of Stirling